Anjelica may refer to:

 Anjelica Huston, an American actress
 Anjelica Selden, African-American athlete
 Anjelica Sanchez, Miss Continental Plus 2004

See also 
 Anjelika (disambiguation)
 Angelica
 Angelika (disambiguation)